The 1895 State of the Union Address was written by Grover Cleveland.  It was presented on Monday, December 2, 1895, to both houses of the 54th United States Congress.  He said, "Although but one American citizen was reported to have been actually wounded, and although the destruction of property may have fallen more heavily upon the missionaries of other nationalities than our own, it plainly behooved this Government to take the most prompt and decided action to guard against similar or perhaps more dreadful calamities befalling the hundreds of American mission stations which have grown up throughout the interior of China under the temperate rule of toleration, custom, and imperial edict.

References

State of the Union addresses
Presidencies of Grover Cleveland
53rd United States Congress
State of the Union Address
State of the Union Address
State of the Union Address
State of the Union Address
December 1895 events
State of the Union